Czarnecki (feminine Czarnecka; plural Czarneccy) is a Polish surname. It may refer to:
 Arkadiusz Czarnecki (born 1987), Polish footballer
 Karen Czarnecki, American politician
 Kazimierz Czarnecki (weightlifter) (born 1948), Polish weightlifter
 Kazimierz Czarnecki (engineer), (1916 - 30 January 2005) was a Polish aeronautics engineer who worked for NACA, later NASA.
 Krzysztof Czarnecki (born 1957), Polish politician
 Marek Czarnecki (born 1959), Polish politician
 Ryszard Czarnecki (born 1963), Polish politician
 Witold Czarnecki (born 1953), Polish politician

See also
 
 
 Czarniecki
 Przemysław Czarnek (born 1977), Polish politician, minister of education and science in 2020
 Chernetskyi
 Chernetsky

References

Polish-language surnames